The 2007–08 Liga Artzit season began on 17 August 2007 and 24 May 2008. Hapoel Jerusalem won the title and were promoted to Liga Leumit alongside runners-up Maccabi Ironi Kiryat Ata. Maccabi HaShikma Ramat Hen and Hapoel Kfar Shalem were relegated to Liga Alef

Final table

Results

First round

Second round

Third round

Top goalscorers

See also
List of Israeli football transfers 2007–08
2007–08 Toto Cup Artzit

Liga Artzit seasons
3
Israel